The Bob Mathias Story is a 1954 American sports drama film directed by Francis D. Lyon and starring Bob Mathias and Ward Bond. The story of Bob Mathias (portraying himself), the first man to win two consecutive Olympic Gold Medals in the Decathlon in London in 1948 and in Helsinki in 1952. His wife Melba appeared as herself. The film utilized extensive footage of the London and Helsinki Games, including actual footage of Mathias' triumphs. It was produced and distributed by Allied Artists and was marketed as being similar to other biopics The Stratton Story and The Glenn Miller Story.

Plot

Cast
 Bob Mathias as Bob Mathias
 Ward Bond as Coach Jackson
 Melba Mathias as Melba Mathias
 Howard Petrie as Dr. Charles Mathias
 Ann Doran as Mrs. Lillian Mathias
 Diane Jergens as Pat Mathias
 Paul Bryar as Bill Andrews
 Anne Kimbell as Sally
 Harry Lauter as Irving Mondschein

References

External links 
 
 
 

1954 films
1950s biographical drama films
Allied Artists films
American biographical drama films
American black-and-white films
Biographical films about sportspeople
Cultural depictions of American men
Cultural depictions of track and field athletes
Films directed by Francis D. Lyon
Films about the 1952 Summer Olympics
Films about the 1948 Summer Olympics
Films about Olympic track and field
Films scored by Leith Stevens
1954 drama films
1950s English-language films
1950s American films